Abdul Majeed Mahir is a Maldivian politician, born in Fuvahmulah to Funaadu Ganduvaru Aisha Didi of Fuvahmulah and Velaanaagey Mohamed Didi of Male, Maldives. He served high government posts during the reign of his nephew, President Ibrahim Nasir, such as the position of Deputy Minister of Finance and the position of Deputy Minister of Peace and Security (Mahkamatul Aman Aammuge Veriyaage Naib) according to some sources. He also served as the President of Male Municipality from 1960 to 1961 and served in the Management of MWSC (Male' Water and Sewerage Company) during the reign of President Maumoon Abdul Gayoom.

After the multi-party system started functioning in the Maldives, Mahir became a supporter of Maldivian Democratic Party and is an outspoken critic of President Maumoon Abdul Gayoom. Mahir is the father of Minister of Defense in the Cabinet of President Mohamed Nasheed's government, Ameen Faisal and Maldivian High Commissioner to the United Kingdom of Great Britain and Northern Ireland back then, Dr. Farahanaz Faisal.

Mahir is an expert on Natural and Alternative medicine and has published books on the subject too.

References

Living people
Maldivian politicians
Year of birth missing (living people)